Polynoncus juglans is a species of hide beetle in the subfamily Omorginae found in Brazil and Guyana.

References

juglans
Beetles described in 1978
Insects of South America